Gladiolus watsonius  is a Gladiolus species found in the granite slopes of Southwest Cape, South Africa.

References

watsonius